

New York Is Now! is an album by the American jazz saxophonist and composer Ornette Coleman released on the Blue Note label in 1968.

The album sees Coleman accompanied by John Coltrane's former bandmates, drummer Elvin Jones and bassist Jimmy Garrison, and by tenor sax player Dewey Redman. Vocals are provided by Mel Fuhrman. It was recorded at A&R Studios, New York City in two sessions, on April 29 (tracks 1, 2, 4 & 6), and May 7 (tracks 3 & 5), 1968.

Reception

Phil Freeman noted "The interplay between the two saxophonists was fierce, and the rhythm section, borrowed from John Coltrane, combined powerhouse swing with an ineffable gravitas. This feeling of greater grounded-ness is what makes New York is Now! and Love Call unique among Coleman’s discography, whether on Blue Note or otherwise; the tempos aren’t much slower than on his other mid ’60s albums, but they feel somehow heavier here, Jones driving the beat as Garrison strums his bass like a massive guitar. The two albums don’t even seem to exist as separate entities—they feel like two halves of a whole, the compositions all sharing the ebullience and, in their slower moments, the deep feeling of the blues that have marked Ornette’s music since the 1950s".

Allmusic awarded the album three stars and reviewer Thom Jurek stated "New York Is Now is one of the true curiosity pieces in Ornette's catalog". Jurek sees the album finding Coleman "in some sense, at odds with himself" and the rhythm section, which he finds "a lot more modally than harmonically propelled". In particular, he identifies drummer Elvin Jones as sounding restricted by the album's slow tempos. Jurek is also unfavourable about Coleman's violin playing. On the whole, he characterises New York Is Now as  "pleasant and amusing if not amazing".

Release history
The album was originally released as an LP by Blue Note Records in 1968. A compact disc version was first issued on January 27, 1990.

Track listing
All compositions by Ornette Coleman.
 "The Garden of Souls" – 13:57 
 "Toy Dance" – 7:25 
 "Broadway Blues" – 8:40 
 "Broadway Blues" (alternate version) – 7:33 (bonus track on CD reissue)
 "Round Trip" – 6:17 
 "We Now Interrupt for a Commercial" – 3:19
Recorded at A&R Studios, New York City on April 29 (tracks 1, 2, 4 & 6), and May 7 (tracks 3 & 5), 1968.

Personnel

Performance
Ornette Coleman – alto saxophone (tracks 1-5), violin (track 6), trumpet
Mel Fuhrman – vocals
Jimmy Garrison – bass
Elvin Jones – drums
Dewey Redman – tenor saxophone

Production
 Michael Cuscuna – liner notes, reissue producer
 Dave Sanders – engineer
 Francis Wolff – producer

References

External links
 Ornette Coleman official site

1968 albums
Ornette Coleman albums
Blue Note Records albums
Albums produced by Francis Wolff